Inti Guttu is a 1958 Indian Telugu-language drama film, produced by Akella Sastry and directed by Vedantam Raghavayya. It stars N. T. Rama Rao and Savitri, with music composed by M. S. Prakash. It is a partly based on the Hindi film Munimji (1955).

Plot 
Zamindar Tirumala Rao's (Gummadi) wife Mahalakshmamma (Pushpavalli) and his sister Nancharamma (Suryakantham) deliver male children on the same day. To give their son a better life, Nancharamma & her husband Seshachalam (Mahankali Venkaiah) swap the infants. After that, due to Nancharamma's ploy, Mahalakshmamma seeks asylum in an ashram. Now Seshachalam decides to get rid of Tirumala Rao's child, so he leaves him in the same ashram whom Mahalakshamma raises without knowing the truth. Years roll by, Prabhakar (R. Nageswara Rao) Nancharamma's original son becomes a huge burglar and commits robberies along with his moll Rita (Rajasulochana). Gopal (N. T. Rama Rao) Tirumala Rao's son becomes a police officer is specially appointed to lookout for the robber's gang. In the beginning, he suspects Nancharamma's daughter Sobha (Savitri), so he joins as a driver in their house and falls in love with her. Under the impression that Prabhakar is his son, Tirumala Rao plans to perform his marriage with Sobha. At last, Nancharamma reveals the truth when Prabhakar attacks her and drags Sobha to his den to steal her jewelry. After a feisty fight, Gopal brings the culprits to book. Finally, Tirumala Rao & Mahalakshmamma reunite and the movie ends on a happy note with the marriage of Gopal & Sobha.

Cast 
N. T. Rama Rao as Gopal
Savitri as Sobha
Gummadi as Tirumala Rao
Relangi as Bhadrachalam
R. Nageswara Rao as Prabhakaram
K. V. S. Sarma as Swamiji
Mahankali Venkaiah as Seshachalam
Jagga Rao
Suryakantham as Nancharamma
Rajasulochana as Rita
Pushpavalli as Mahalakshmamma

Production 
Inti Guttu is a remake of the Hindi film Munimji (1955), but differs in many respects: the hero disguises himself as an aged driver, unlike the original where he disguises as an accountant. An original creation to Inti Guttu was the patriarch's sister, who was not present in the Hindi version. In Munimji, the woman whom the patriarch secretly married swaps her newly born son with his deceased wife's child, but in Inti Guttu, the sister's husband interchanges the children.

Soundtrack 

Music composed by M. S. Prakash. Lyrics were written by Malladi Ramakrishna Sastry.

References

External links 

 

1958 drama films
1958 films
Films directed by Vedantam Raghavayya
Indian black-and-white films
Indian drama films
Telugu remakes of Hindi films